Goodwillie is a surname. Notable people with the surname include:

David Goodwillie (born 1989), Scottish footballer
David Goodwillie (author) (born 1972), American writer

See also
Goodwillie–Allen House, a historical house in Bend, Oregon, United States